Fin de Siglo (End of Century) (1998) is the fifteenth studio album by Mexican rock and blues band El Tri. The most successful single was "Nostalgia" a song about the generational circle completing with the end of century. The band count with the participation of famous singer-songwriter and producer Andres Calamaro.

Track listing 
All tracks by Alex Lora except where noted.

 "Todo Me Sale Mal" (Everything I Do Comes Out Wrong) – 3:42
 "Nostalgia" – 4:27
 "El Voceador" (The Newspaper Vendor) – 4:22
 "El Futuro del Mundo" (The Future of the World) – 5:13
 "Quién Da Un Peso Por Mis Sueños" (Who Gives a Dime for My Dreams) (Armando Manzanero) – 3:06
 "Cásate o Muérete" (Marry or Die) – 5:45
 "Gandalla" (Swine) – 2:42
 "El Blues del Taxista" (The Cabdriver's Blues) – 3:14
 "El Viagra" – 3:32
 "No Hay Pedo" (Slang for "No Problem") – 2:32
 "Amarga Navidad" (Bitter Christmas) – 5:23
 "Todo Se Vale" (Everything Goes) (Lora, Carlos Carvajal) – 4:54
 "Cotorreando Con la Banda" (Chatting Up with the Band) – 4:18
 "Razas Gemelas" (Twin Races) (Lora, Eduardo Chico) – 3:08

Personnel 
 Alex Lora – bass, vocals, producer, mixing
 Rafael Salgado – harmonic
 Eduardo Chico – guitar
 Oscar Zarate – guitar
 Chela Lora – backing vocals, concept, vocals in "Gandalla"
 Lalo Toral – piano
 Ramon Perez – drums
 Sergio Rivero – photography
 Andres Calamaro – vocals in "Casate o Muerete"

Technical personnel 
John Hendrickson – mixing, mixing assistant, percussion
Jean B. Smith – engineer, mixing
Juan Carlos Paz y Puente – A&R
Maricela Valencia – Coordination

External links 
www.eltri.com.mx
Fin de Siglo at MusicBrainz
[ Fin de Siglo] at Allmusic

1998 albums
El Tri albums
Warner Music Group albums